Gatesville Independent School District is a public school district based in Gatesville, Texas (USA).

In addition to Gatesville, the district serves the town of South Mountain as well as rural areas in central Coryell County. A very small portion of Bell County also lies within the district.

In 2009, the school district was rated "academically acceptable" by the Texas Education Agency.

Schools 
 Gatesville High (Grades 9-12)
 Gatesville Junior High (Grades 7-8)
 Gatesville Intermediate (Grades 4-6)
 Gatesville Elementary (Grades 1-3)
 2004 National Blue Ribbon School
 Gatesville Primary (Grades PK-K)

References

External links 

 Gatesville ISD

School districts in Bell County, Texas
School districts in Coryell County, Texas
Gatesville, Texas